Støren Station is a railway station located in the village of Støren in the municipality of Midtre Gauldal in Trøndelag county, Norway. The station is located at the split between the Dovre Line and the Røros Line, with the former heading south via Gudbrandsdalen to Eastern Norway while the latter heads down Østerdalen to Eastern Norway. Støren is served by regional trains on the Røros Line and express trains on the Dovre Line by SJ Norge.

History

The station was built as part of Trondhjem–Støren Line in 1864. It was connected with the Rørosbanen in 1877 and to the Dovre Line in 1921. At the same time it was converted from narrow gauge to standard gauge.

On 1 May 1922, the restaurant was taken over by Norsk Spisevognselskap. On 26 April 1940, the station was destroyed during the fighting of the Norwegian Campaign of World War II. Quickly afterwards a kiosk was erected, and one year after the original station's destruction, a new station building and restaurant was opened. It was further expanded in 1949.

References

Midtre Gauldal
Railway stations in Trøndelag
Railway stations on the Dovre Line
Railway stations on the Røros Line
Railway stations opened in 1864
1864 establishments in Norway